Anto Pejić (born 21 February 1989 in Croatia) is a Croatian footballer.

Career
In 2009/10, Pejić made 2 appearances for NK Olimpija Ljubljana in the Slovenian top flight.

In 2011, he signed for Slovenian second division side NK Bela Krajina, scoring 8 goals in his first 13 games.

After playing in Macedonia with FK Teteks and Vietnam with SHB Da Nang, he played in the Norwegian fourth division before joining Icelandic second division club Ungmennafélagið Leiknir midway through 2016. From there, Pejić played in the Croatian lower leagues with NK Nehaj as well as the German amateur leagues with Posavina Frankfurt.

In 2018, he signed for Indian state league outfit Pathachakra after more investment was being put into the league. Back in Croatia, he left Halubjan Viškovo for Vinodol in February 2022.

References

External links
 Anto Pejić at Soccerway

1989 births
Living people
Association football forwards
Croatian footballers
NK Olimpija Ljubljana (2005) players
NK Pomorac 1921 players
NK Bela Krajina players
FK Teteks players
SHB Da Nang FC players
NK Nehaj players
NK Krk players
Slovenian PrvaLiga players
Slovenian Second League players
Macedonian First Football League players
V.League 1 players
Norwegian Third Division players
1. deild karla players
Calcutta Football League players
Croatian expatriate footballers
Expatriate footballers in Slovenia
Croatian expatriate sportspeople in Slovenia
Expatriate footballers in North Macedonia
Croatian expatriate sportspeople in North Macedonia
Expatriate footballers in Vietnam
Croatian expatriate sportspeople in Vietnam
Expatriate footballers in Norway
Croatian expatriate sportspeople in Norway
Expatriate footballers in Iceland
Croatian expatriate sportspeople in Iceland
Expatriate footballers in Germany
Croatian expatriate sportspeople in Germany
Expatriate footballers in India
Croatian expatriate sportspeople in India